Coop is a fictional character who appeared in the American television supernatural drama Charmed, which aired on the WB Television Network (the WB) from 1998 to 2006. The character was created by executive producer Brad Kern and was portrayed by Victor Webster. Coop is depicted as a Cupid, a magical being associated with love, who is over two centuries old. He appeared in the last seven episodes of the final season of Charmed, and appears in canonical works from the expanded universe material, such as the series' comic book adaptation.

Fictional character background

Television
Cupids are a race of magical beings associated with love. Coop was sent by the Elders to help Phoebe with her love life. He gave her advice, and took her to the past to see her past loves (Cole Turner, Dex Lawson, etc.), allowing her to love again.

Later in the series, they fall in love (Coop falls first and Phoebe falls for Michael, whom Coop was manipulating Phoebe to love), although it was forbidden for a Cupid to fall in love with a human, similar to how it was forbidden for Whitelighters to date, marry, or have children with their charges. Only later in the series does Phoebe begin to admit her feelings for Coop.

In the show's finale, the future adult Wyatt exclaims "Uncle Coop!" upon seeing him, which accidentally lets slip that Coop is Phoebe's husband and thus his and Chris' uncle. While Chris immediately hits Wyatt to hush him up since he has revealed the unknown future, Phoebe seems freaked out at this idea, since she knows about the forbidden nature of this romance. After he tries to talk to her and reassure her to no avail, he finds himself attacked by Billie's manipulative demon friend Dumain for his ring's time travel ability. Also in the finale, Piper uses his ring to travel through time to save Phoebe and Paige.

When Phoebe's calls for him fail, Wyatt and Chris reveal that their love is given a blessing (and was the main underlying reason he was actually sent down) by the Elders to make up for all the events they put her through as a Charmed One. In the exact words of Wyatt, "It wasn't, and it will not be, a forbidden love." In addition to that, she was able to bring him to her by simply thinking of him due to their connection. The Charmed Ones are able to use Billie's Projection power to travel back in time, and after they vanquish the Triad and Piper vanquishes Dumain, Paige retrieves his ring from Christy and Piper gives it back to him upon their return to the present.

The same episode, which depicts the futures of the Charmed Ones, shows their wedding and the three daughters they eventually have.

In season 3, Phoebe is told that an apple peel in water will take the form of the first letter of the name of her true love. It is a "C," which at that time was meant to imply Cole. This prediction does come to pass though, as Coop is revealed to be her true love.  Also noteworthy is the fact that Phoebe became briefly infatuated with the unnamed Cupid that the sisters aided in the Season 2 episode, "Heartbreak City".  The Cupid in that episode also told Phoebe that her heart was closed to the men in her life, and that she was falling for him because she loved the idea of love.

Literature
In 2010, Charmed gained an officially licensed continuation in the form of a comic book, which is often billed as Charmed: Season 9.  The series is published monthly by Zenescope Entertainment. Set eighteen months after the series finale, Coop is seen living a happy, demon-free life with his wife Phoebe and their first daughter, who is named Prudence Johnna Halliwell and nicknamed P.J. by Grams.

In the 14th issue of the comic, Cupid's Harrow, after he expressed grief over the fact that he never got to know his family, Phoebe arranged for him to meet his distant relatives, the Coopersmiths. In Issue #20 of the comic, The Old Witchero, Coop and Phoebe welcomed their second daughter, Parker Halliwell.

Characterization 
Actor Victor Webster has said of his character, "I think he just loves life, he loves love. I think he's very charming and easy-going and lighthearted. I think he just generally enjoys being around people and really helping people." He says he was chosen for the part because he displays many of those traits himself. However, he also claimed that playing "the perfect guy" was something of a struggle, "Coop is extremely confident. He knows all about love and relationships, and the problem with a guy who's so sure of himself is that you can play him very cocky and arrogant, and that can be somewhat off-putting." The actor explains that falling in love takes a great deal of humility, and that required him to bring a self-deprecating quality to his performance: "you learn about your faults and how to overcome them if the relationship means that much to you."

Victor Webster has admitted that his biggest fear in playing the role of Cupid was the chance that he would have to wear diapers, and has joked, “If that was the case, then I was going to ask for at least one million dollars per episode!” One of his first questions before accepting the part was, "Am I going to be naked the whole time?" When asked if he would be wearing Cupid's iconic diaper and wings, Webster quipped, "Big safety pins down the side," before explaining that he would in fact be "dressed very dapper – suits, button-down shirts, sports coats."

Discussing the challenges of playing a mythological character, the actor says that his approach was to make Coop a "real person". He explains, "If you get into the mythological character and you start playing it otherworldly, it just comes off weird. I think he would just be a regular guy. He'd be very charming. He'd be very confident. Let's say he wasn't Cupid, let's say he's a master of love, what would he have? That's how I start looking at it. I think he'd have a great sense of humor, sense of style. He can probably dance and cook and tell good jokes, be a lot of fun, have a lot of positive energy, want to lift you up. Obviously he would take great care of himself. He would look immaculate the whole time."

Powers and abilities 
All of Coop's powers, with the exception of telekinesis, immortality, beaming, sensing, and regeneration, were shown to derive from his ring. However, in earlier seasons, cupids did require their rings to teleport. Coop has used these additional powers via his ring:
Stopping time (only applies to charges) - Coop has the ability to slow down time to the degree that they appear to be frozen in time, while causing that being and even others to be at normal speed, as well, for an indefinite period.
Suggestion - Coop can slip into people's hearts and minds and implant thoughts. He mainly uses this power to set people on the path to love by making them realize their true feelings for another.
Time travel - Coop can travel through time, but doesn't (or is not allowed to) manipulate the past. Coop used this power to take Phoebe back in time to some of her past loves. Anyone who has the ring is able to access this power at least as shown by Piper Halliwell and Christy Jenkins.
Holograms - Coop also has the ability to project light- and energy-based images of all shapes and sizes for a variety of effects and reasons. He used it to show Phoebe another part of her past.
Reality warping (on a limited scale) - Coop has used this power to see how blocked Phoebe's heart really was and unblocked it, to insert Paige into Henry's body, and to absorb the soul of a deceased child into his ring and transport the child to Cupid's Temple.

Besides his ring, Coop also owns a Cupid's Bow, which was introduced in Issue #11 of the comic, Last Witch Effort.

References 

Charmed (TV series) characters
Fictional angels
Television characters introduced in 2006
Fictional characters with death or rebirth abilities
Fictional characters with immortality
Fictional characters with precognition
Fictional characters who can teleport
Fictional empaths
Fictional telekinetics